The Ames Free Library is a public library designed by noted American architect H. H. Richardson. It is located at 53 Main Street, Easton, Massachusetts, immediately adjacent to another Richardson building, Oakes Ames Memorial Hall.

In 2016 the Ames Free Library won the Best Small Library in America award from the Library Journal. This award was created in 2005 by the Bill & Melinda Gates Foundation to encourage and showcase outstanding libraries serving populations of fewer than 25,000. This marks the second time the library has won this award.

History
On the death of Oliver Ames, Jr., he left $50,000 for the construction of a library. The will stipulated that it was to be a private institution, not owned by the town, but operated in trust for the public. The request was carried out by Ames' children, Frederick Lothrop Ames and Helen Angier Ames. They hired Henry Hobson Richardson to design the building. The final cost of the building came to at least $80,000.

The library was built from 1877 to 1879, although it did not open until March 10, 1883. It is generally rectangular, with broad gable projecting from its north end and a rectangular tower rising where the gable meets the main mass. The gable's front facade contains a heavily arched entry on the first floor and a row of five arched windows separated by pairs of short columns above. The facade is light-brown Milford granite laid in random ashlar with reddish-brown Longmeadow brownstone trim. Its roof is red-orange tile. A children's wing (red brick) was added in 1931, eliminating the original lavatory and document room.

Within, the library's major rooms, stack wing, hall, and reading room are laid out longitudinally. The reading room's fireplace is primarily by Stanford White, and the stone and bronze medallions of Oliver Ames, Jr. were designed by Augustus Saint-Gaudens.

See also
 H. H. Richardson Historic District of North Easton
 North Easton Historic District

References

External links

Gallery

Library buildings completed in 1883
Libraries in Bristol County, Massachusetts
Henry Hobson Richardson buildings
Public libraries in Massachusetts
1883 establishments in Massachusetts
Libraries on the National Register of Historic Places in Massachusetts
National Register of Historic Places in Bristol County, Massachusetts
Richardsonian Romanesque architecture in Massachusetts
Historic district contributing properties in Massachusetts
Butler–Ames family